Anne Murray Powell (26 April 1755 – 10 March 1849) was an author in Upper Canada, mother of nine children, and the wife of Chief Justice William Dummer Powell.

Early life 
Born Anne Murray in Wells, Norfolk, England, to Dr. John Murray and Mary Boyles, the daughter of a customs collector. Her father was born in Scotland and became a surgeon in the Royal Navy. In 1751, he graduated from the University of Edinburgh and retired on half-pay from the Navy in order to establish himself with a private medical practice at Wells and then Norwich. He was remembered as one "who distinguished himself by encouraging every charitable pursuit". He was involved in the formation of the Scots Society in 1775. Anne Murray was born April 26, 1755. In 1769 Anne Murray's aunt Elizabeth Murray, who was a successful widowed shopkeeper in Boston Massachusetts, offered to care for Dr. Murray's three oldest children John (II), Mary, and Anne. Anne's brother and sister were sent in 1769 while Anne did not voyage to Boston until Elizabeth's departure in 1771. In 1774 Anne's sister Mary left for England leaving Anne in charge of her aunt Elizabeth's shop, Anne would later refer to this as "the worst time of my life". Anne found relief from this "mundane" life when she met William Dummer Powell in 1775.

Adult life and career 

Anne Murray married William Dummer Powell on 3 Oct. 1775 in Boston, Massachusetts. They had nine children of whom two survived her. She died at Toronto. After marrying William Dummer Powell on 3 Oct. 1775 in Boston Massachusetts, they shortly left for England due to William's political views as a member of the loyalist party. At the time of the marriage Anne was twenty and William was twenty-one. Arriving in England shortly after being wed Anne would give birth to three children while William studied law. In 1780 the family would leave England for Montreal, where William had started a law practice. Anne and William moved to York in 1798 as a way for "members of the elite to have a role in Upper Canadian government". Anne took on a serious role in the Upper Canadian political sphere with her role as the wife of a prominent official, which would be crucial for William's future climb to chief justiceship.

Mrs. Powell was considered to be the "social arbiter" of Toronto in the years preceding her husband's death on September 6, 1834. During her time as the social arbiter she is best known for challenging then Lieutenant Governor of Upper Canada Francis Gore. Anne publicly challenged Gore on his treatment of Mrs. John Small who was accused of adultery.

Anne Murray Powell, along with her husband Chief Justice William Dummer Powell, have one of the largest surviving record of personal letters from the period of 1771-1840. "Throughout her long life, Mrs Powell was an inveterate writer of letters. More than 700 of them have survived "(describing) the excitement of enemy invasion in 1813 and armed rebellion in 1837, and the 'system of wrong and Robbery' embodied in the 1839 Clergy Reserves bill".

The more than 700 letters that have survived to this day range from letters to friends near Boston to family in England. These letters give us insight to community, social spheres in Canada, politics, and even American-Canadian relations in the later 1700s and early 1800s. Anne Murray Powell would later die in Toronto on 10 March 1849, just before her ninety-fourth birthday.

Bibliography

References

External links 

Biography at the Dictionary of Canadian Biography Online

1755 births
1849 deaths
United Empire Loyalists
Canadian women non-fiction writers
English women writers
People from Wells-next-the-Sea